"The Dalotek Affair" is the seventeenth episode aired of the first series of UFO - a 1970 British television science fiction series about an alien invasion of Earth. The screenplay was written by Ruric Powell and the director was Alan Perry. The episode was filmed between 15 July to 25 July 1969 and aired on the ATV Midlands on 10 February 1971. Though shown as the sixteenth episode, it was actually the seventh to have been filmed.

The series was created by Gerry Anderson and Sylvia Anderson with Reg Hill, and produced by the Andersons and Lew Grade's Century 21 Productions for Grade's ITC Entertainment company.

Story
The episode is almost entirely a flashback that Colonel Foster has as he sees a woman while dining with Colonel Alec Freeman:

Unexplained communication blackouts are affecting the SHADO Moonbase. Foster believes that the nearby Dalotek Corporation lunar base may be causing the issues through use of their geological scanner. During another blackout a Lunar module crashes when trying to land, killing the crew on board.

Foster investigates Dalotek and disables a piece of their equipment thought to be the cause. However, this does not stop the blackouts. The Dalotek team discovers an alien jamming device, placed by the aliens in a lunar crater using a meteor that crashed on the Moon (a fact that Commander Straker realises while watching a TV interview with Dr. Frank Stranges). Foster sends out a team to destroy the jamming device before an incoming alien UFO attacks Moonbase. With the device destroyed, the UFO can be targeted and also destroyed.

The epilogue reveals that the woman was Jane Carson, the Dalotek employee Foster was flirting with, who had her memory wiped due to SHADO security protocol.

Cast

Starring
 Ed Bishop — Col. Edward "Ed" Straker, Commander-in-chief of SHADO
 Michael Billington — Col. Paul J. Foster
 George Sewell — Col. Alec E. Freeman, Second-in-command of SHADO
 Dolores Mantez — Lt. Nina Barry
 Keith Alexander — Lt. Keith Ford
 Ayshea — Lt. Ayshea Johnson

Also Starring
 Tracy Reed — Jane Carson	
 Dr. Frank Stranges — Himself

Featuring
 Basil Moss — Dr. Frazer	
 Clinton Greyn — Mark Tanner	
 David Weston — Phil Mitchell	
 Philip Latham — Blake	
 John Breslin — Dr. Charles Reed	
 Alan Tucker — Lunar Module Pilot	
 John Cobner — Capt. in Moonmobile	
 Richard Poore — Lt. in Moonmobile

Production notes
 Locations used for the filming included Neptune House, ATV Elstree Studios, Borehamwood.
 Dr. Frank Stranges was the real-life founder of the National Investigations Committee on Unidentified Flying Objects (NICUFO). The screened interview was shot just before the beginning of the TV series.

References

External links

1971 British television episodes
UFO (TV series) episodes